Lothar "Emma" Emmerich (29 November 1941 – 13 August 2003) was a German football player and manager who played as a forward. He was born in Dortmund-Dorstfeld and died in Hemer.

He won five caps for West Germany in 1966.

Emmerich scored 115 goals in only 183 Bundesliga matches.

Career statistics

Club

International

Honours
Borussia Dortmund
 German football championship: 1963
 DFB-Pokal: 1964–65
 European Cup Winners' Cup: 1965–66

Germany
 FIFA World Cup Runner-up: 1966

Individual
 Bundesliga top scorer: 1965–66, 1966–67
 Belgian First Division top goalscorer: 1969–70

References

External links
 
 
 

1941 births
2003 deaths
Footballers from Dortmund
German footballers
Association football forwards
Germany international footballers
Bundesliga players
2. Bundesliga players
Belgian Pro League players
Borussia Dortmund players
K. Beerschot V.A.C. players
FC Kärnten players
1. FC Schweinfurt 05 players
Würzburger Kickers players
1966 FIFA World Cup players
German football managers
1. FSV Mainz 05 managers
Würzburger Kickers managers
West German expatriate footballers
West German expatriate sportspeople in Belgium
Expatriate footballers in Belgium
West German expatriate sportspeople in Austria
West German footballers
West German football managers